The Libyan Agricultural Bank is an agricultural development bank operating under special law and owned by the Libyan government. Established in 1957, it provides advice and guidance on agricultural problems, advances loans to agricultural cooperatives, and generally assists in developing Libya’s agricultural community. The Bank operates one city branch from its headquarters in Tripoli and another 27 branches throughout Libya. The Bank is also a member of the Near East-North Africa Regional Agricultural Credit Association (NENARACA) based in Amman, Jordan.

See also
Agriculture in Libya
List of banks
List of banks in Libya

Notes

External links
Libyan Agricultural Bank
Banks of Libya
NENARACA Website

Banks of Libya
Agriculture in Libya
Banks established in 1957
Economy of Tripoli, Libya